Popstars (UK) is a British reality television show produced for ITV that aired for two series. The first series, Popstars, aimed to find five singers to form a new pop group. During the second series, Popstars: The Rivals, two music groups were formed to compete for the Christmas number-one single in the United Kingdom.

The five winning contestants from the first series formed the group Hear'Say. Their first two singles, "Pure and Simple" and "The Way to Your Love", became number-one hits on the UK Singles Chart. Two other single releases, "Everybody" and "Lovin' Is Easy", reached the top ten. Hear'Say released their first album Popstars in May 2001; this was followed by a second album, Everybody. After a line-up change, the group split a year after formation.

In the second series, two new groups, Girls Aloud and One True Voice, were formed. They competed for the Christmas number-one in 2002 with their debut singles "Sound of the Underground" and "Sacred Trust / After You're Gone" respectively; Girls Aloud finished on top and debuted at number one, and One True Voice debuted at number two. One True Voice released another single, "Shakespeare's (Way with) Words" before splitting in June 2003. Girls Aloud, in contrast, have become one of the most successful female groups in the United Kingdom, with 21 successive top-ten singles (including four number-ones), and six top-ten albums (including two number-ones). During the group's three-year hiatus, Cheryl Cole, Nadine Coyle, and Nicola Roberts also went on to release solo material. Girls Aloud reunited to celebrate their tenth anniversary in 2012.

In addition to the winners of the show, several other participants have achieved careers in music. Liberty X (originally known as Liberty before a legal dispute) has had eight top ten singles in the UK charts, including the number-one hit "Just a Little" in 2002. Kym Marsh released a solo album and two singles after leaving Hear'Say, and Darius Danesh, who did not advance past the audition stage, released material after appearing on Pop Idol. Javine Hylton, the singer who missed out on a place in Girls Aloud, debuted at number four with "Real Things and released several other singles. She was selected as the United Kingdom's entry for the 2005 Eurovision Song Contest, singing "Touch My Fire". The four other female finalists formed the band Clea, and the five losing male finalists experienced success in their band Phixx. The Cheeky Girls, a Romanian duo who did not make the live finals, were given a record contract, and debuted at number three behind the two winning bands.

Singles

Albums
Only albums that charted in the Top 100 of the UK albums chart are included in this list.

Other releases
Liberty X recorded a version of Kool and the Gang's "Fresh", which charted at number 58 on the Australian Singles Chart.
In addition to recording her own solo album following the split of Hear'Say, Myleene Klass signed a deal with EMI Classics which allowed her to choose her own tracks for a series of classical albums. She recorded two songs each for Music for Romance and Music for Mothers.
Darius Danesh appeared on the first series but was eliminated at the audition stage. He reached the final three in Pop Idol and had a succession of hit singles.
Clea released two albums, Identity Crisis and Trinity; the former was released only in Russia and the latter charted at number 258 on the UK Albums Chart. They also re-released "Stuck in the Middle" in 2006 as a joint single with "I Surrender", but the song failed to chart.

See also

Fame Academy discography
Pop Idol discography
The X Factor (UK) discography

Notes
 Javine Hylton is known professionally by her first name only. She was due to release a song with the producer Richard X but the single was cancelled.
 "Don't Let the Morning Come" was a collaboration with Soul Avengerz.
 Kym Marsh continued to be known professionally by this name despite her marriage to Jack Ryder. She was originally a part of the band Hear'Say
 Liberty X were originally known as Liberty but changed their name in 2002. This was following a high-profile court case where another UK band with the same name claimed that their name was being used without permission. Readers of The Sun chose the name X Liberty but the band decided to call themselves Liberty X.
 "Being Nobody" was credited as Richard X vs. Liberty X.
 Clea recorded "We Don't Have to Take Our Clothes Off" with Da Playaz and the release was credited as Da Playaz vs. Clea.
 "Walk This Way" was released by Girls Aloud in collaboration with fellow British girl group Sugababes as the Comic Relief single in 2007, charting at number-one.
 Girls Aloud's album Mixed Up was a bonus CD offered exclusively at Woolworths which contained remixes of the Tangled Up album tracks.
 Girls A Live is a live album to accompany Out of Control that was initially available at Woolworths.
 Cheryl Cole was credited on the release of will.i.am's 2008 single "Heartbreaker" as having sung backing vocals.

References

Popstars
Popstars